Nicotiana rustica is a plant in the family Solanaceae, native to Western Australia, South Australia and the Northern Territory.

N. rosulata was first described in 1899 as Nicotiana suaveolens var. rosulata by Spencer Le Marchant Moore, but the taxon was elevated to species status by Karel Domin in 1929.

References

External links 
Nicotiana rosulata: images & occurrence data from GBIF

rosulata
Flora of South Australia
Flora of Western Australia
Flora of the Northern Territory
Plants described in 1899
Tobacco
Tobacco in Australia